A Few Seconds of Panic is a nonfiction first-person narrative by Stefan Fatsis, published in 2008. The book chronicles Fatsis, a professional 43-year-old sportswriter working for The Wall Street Journal, and his attempt to play in the National Football League. Along the way, he relates the personal stories and struggles that professional football players face in the league. After some setbacks, Fatsis eventually finds some success as a backup placekicker for the Denver Broncos. The book's title comes from Jason Elam's description of being a kicker as "hours and hours of boredom surrounded by a few seconds of panic."

A Few Seconds of Panic has been compared to George Plimpton's Paper Lion, a 1966 book wherein the author joins the Detroit Lions as a backup quarterback.

Featured persons

Kickers 
 Jason Elam
 Paul Ernster
 Tyler Fredrickson
 Micah Knorr
 Todd Sauerbrun

Other players 
 P. J. Alexander
 Jay Cutler
 Preston Parsons
 Jake Plummer
 Bradlee Van Pelt

Coaches and staff 
 Pat Bowlen
 Ronnie Bradford
 Mike Shanahan
 Paul Woodside

See also
 Gonzo journalism
 I Was a Toronto Blue Jay –  a similar account of sportswriter Tom Verducci joining the Toronto Blue Jays of Major League Baseball for spring training in 2005.
 Word Freak – Fatsis's previous book, a look into the world of competitive Scrabble

References

External links 
 Author's website
 Book-related photos from author's website

2008 non-fiction books
American football books
Popular culture books
Denver Broncos